The Coweta County School District is the primary education system in Coweta County, Georgia, United States. Its headquarters are an antebellum building on Jackson Street (US 29) at Sprayberry Road in Newnan, Georgia. Coweta County is the 9th-fastest-growing county in Georgia and the 26th-fastest-growing in the country. The school system has grown from 9,210 students in 1984 to over 22,000 students in 2007.

Overview

Elementary schools

 Arbor Springs Elementary
 Arnco-Sargent Elementary
 Atkinson Elementary
 Brooks Elementary
 Canongate Elementary
 Eastside Elementary
 Elm Street Elementary
 Grantville Elementary
 Jefferson Parkway Elementary
 Moreland Elementary
 Newnan Crossing Elementary
 Northside Elementary
 Poplar Road Elementary
 Ruth Hill Elementary
 Thomas Crossroads Elementary
 Western Elementary
 Welch Elementary
 White Oak Elementary
 Willis Road Elementary

Middle schools

 Arnall Middle School
 Blake Bass Middle School
 East Coweta Middle School
 Evans Middle School
 Lee Middle School
 Madras Middle School
 Maggie Brown Middle School
 Smokey Road Middle School
 Central Education Center (CEC) - 8th Grade Academy

High schools
 Newnan High School
 East Coweta High School
 Northgate High School
 Central Education Center (CEC)
 Winston Dowdell Academy

Controversies

Board member's participation in Capitol insurrection
Roughly a week after the January 6th insurrection at the U.S. Capitol, it was revealed Coweta school board member Linda Menk had attended the rally in Washington, D.C. Menk, after facing backlash from the community, refused to resign from her position, and urged her fellow board members that October to leave the Georgia School Boards Association after its parent organization, the National School Boards Association, sent a letter to the Biden presidential administration urging an investigation into the "growing number of threats of violence and acts of intimidation occurring across the nation."

See also

List of school districts in Georgia
The Heritage School, Newnan
Trinity Christian School (Sharpsburg, Georgia)

References

External links
Coweta County School System

School districts in Georgia (U.S. state)
Education in Coweta County, Georgia